Olli Soikkeli (born 1991) is a Finnish jazz guitarist. He was born in Nurmes.

Discography

Solo albums 
 With Rhythm Future Quartet
 2014: Rhythm Future Quartet
 2016: Travels

 With Julien Labro & Olli Soikkeli Quartet
 2017: Rise & Grind

Collaborations 
 2011: Trois Générations, with Hot Club de Finlande and Vitali Imereli
 2012: Kouvola Junction, with Paulus Schäfer and Arnoud van den Berg
 2016: The Best Things in Life Are Free, Hot Club d’Europe

References

External links 
 
 Olli Soikkeli plays Django Reinhardt Ryhtme futur

1991 births
21st-century guitarists
Finnish male guitarists
People from Nurmes
Living people
Finnish jazz guitarists
21st-century male musicians
Male jazz musicians
21st-century Finnish musicians